Abdullahi Aliyu Sumaila (21 March 1946 – 11 January 2003) was a Nigerian politician and administrator. One of the first administrators to inherit the post first republican administrative structure instituted by the military, served the Local Education Authority, Kano State Government and the Federal Government of Nigeria from 1967 to 2003 in various positions. many of his administrative reforms where integrated into the bureaucracy of the Nigerian federation.

References

1946 births
2003 deaths
Politics of Northern Nigeria
People's Redemption Party politicians
Nigerian People's Party politicians
Peoples Democratic Party (Nigeria) politicians
Social Democratic Party (Nigeria) politicians
Ahmadu Bello University alumni
Politicians from Kano State